Rusiate Isaac Lumelume (born 16 April 1998) is a Fiji international rugby league footballer who plays as a er.

He previously played for the Melbourne Storm in the NRL.

Early life
Lumelume played his junior football for Berala Bears and was educated at  Bass High School, Bass Hill. While attending school he represented the New South Wales Under-18 side in 2016 and in 2017 he represented the Under-20 side.

Career

2019
Lumelume made his international debut for Fiji in their 56–14 victory vs Lebanon in the 2019 Pacific Test.

Following his test match performance, he was granted an immediate release from the Cronulla-Sutherland Sharks to take up a mid season transfer to the Melbourne Storm.

Lumelume played his second test for Fiji Bati against Toa Samoa in October.

2020
In Round 16 of the 2020 NRL season, he made his NRL debut for Melbourne against Manly-Warringah at Sunshine Coast Stadium. He had his Melbourne jersey (cap number 205) presented to him by Melbourne Storm team mate Suliasi Vunivalu.

2021
Lumelume played three matches for Melbourne in the 2021 NRL season.  In November, he was released by Melbourne and joined Canterbury.

2022
Lumelume made no appearances for Canterbury in the 2022 NRL season. Lumelume instead featured for the clubs NSW Cup team and played in their grand final loss to Penrith.

2023
On 10 January, it was announced that Lumelume had signed a train and trial contract with Canterbury's arch-rivals Parramatta ahead of the 2023 NRL season.
He made his club debut for Parramatta in round 1 of the 2023 NRL season against his former side Melbourne. Parramatta would lose 16-12 in golden point extra-time.

References

External links
Melbourne Storm profile
Cronulla-Sutherland Sharks profile
Fiji profile

1998 births
Living people
Australian people of I-Taukei Fijian descent
Canterbury-Bankstown Bulldogs players
Fiji national rugby league team players
Melbourne Storm players
Parramatta Eels players
Rugby league centres
Rugby league players from New South Wales